Henricus "Henk" Nicolaas Bouwman (30 June 1926 – 27 December 1995) was a Dutch field hockey player who won a bronze medal at the 1948 Summer Olympics in London. His son Roderik also became an Olympic field hockey player.

References

External links
 

1926 births
1995 deaths
Dutch male field hockey players
Olympic field hockey players of the Netherlands
Field hockey players at the 1948 Summer Olympics
Olympic bronze medalists for the Netherlands
Field hockey players from Amsterdam
Olympic medalists in field hockey
Medalists at the 1948 Summer Olympics
HC Bloemendaal players
20th-century Dutch people